Gustaf Adolf Vive Sparre af Söfdeborg (4 September 1802 – 26 April 1886) was a Swedish nobleman, civil servant and politician. He was Sweden's Prime Minister for Justice, and later served as Chancellor of the Universities, and Marshal of the Realm, as well as several other offices.

Biography
Sparre was born in 1802 into the comital af Söfdeborg branch of the House of Sparre. He enrolled at Uppsala University in 1816 and graduated in 1823, after which he began his career as a jurist. 

In 1848 Sparre was chosen as Prime Minister for Justice, and had to deal with the Revolutions of 1848 as well as the reactionary response in the subsequent years. He resigned in 1856 and became President of the Svea Court of Appeals instead. Sparre also served as Chancellor of both Universities between 1856 and 1867, and was Marshal of the Realm from 1864 until his death.

He was a member of the Riksdag of the Estates between 1834 and 1866, and was between 1867 and 1875 member of the First Chamber for Kopparberg County. He was also a member of several academies and societies, such as the Guild of the Order of the Seraphim (chairman, 1858). the Academy of Sciences (1855), the Academy of Letters, History and Antiquities (honorary, 1848), the Society of Sciences in Uppsala (1848), the Academy of Agriculture (1853), and the Physiographic Society in Lund (1860).

Sparre had no strong political convictions of his own but loyally assisted King Oscar I in aligning national policy in a more conservative direction. He was highly interested in the humanities, especially genealogy.

A headland of Svalbard, Sparreneset, is named after him.

Orders and decorations 

 Knight and Commander of the Orders of His Majesty (Order of the Seraphim)
 Grand Cross of the Order of S:t Olav
 Knight of the Order of the Elephant

References

External links

1802 births
1886 deaths
Swedish Ministers for Justice
Uppsala University alumni
Members of the Första kammaren
Members of the Riksdag of the Estates
Members of the Royal Society of Sciences in Uppsala